Locust Creek is a stream in Morgan County in the U.S. state of Missouri. It is a tributary of Gravois Creek.

Locust Creek was so named on account of locust timber near its course.

See also
List of rivers of Missouri

References

Rivers of Morgan County, Missouri
Rivers of Missouri